The 2009 Aberto de Brasília was a professional tennis tournament played on outdoor hard courts. It was part of the 2009 ATP Challenger Tour. It took place in Brasília, Brazil between 10 and 16 August 2009.

Singles entrants

Seeds

 Rankings are as of August 3, 2009.

Other entrants
The following players received wildcards into the singles main draw:
  Juan Ignacio Chela
  José Pereira
  Eládio Ribeiro Neto
  Mariano Zabaleta

The following players received entry from the qualifying draw:
  Alexandre Bonatto (as a Lucky loser)
  Rodrigo Guidolin
  Daniel King-Turner
  Fabrice Martin
  Iván Miranda

Champions

Singles

 Ricardo Mello def.  Juan Ignacio Chela, 7–6(2), 6–4

Doubles

 Marcelo Demoliner /  Rodrigo Guidolin def.  Ricardo Mello /  Caio Zampieri, 6–4, 6–2

References

ITF search 

Aberto de Brasilia
Aberto de Brasília
Aberto de Brasília
Aberto de Brasília